Kutak-e Qalat (also Romanized as Kūtak-e Qalāt; also known as Kūhtak-e Kūchek and Kūh Tak-e Kūchek) is a village in Karian Rural District, in the Central District of Minab County, Hormozgan Province, Iran. At the 2006 census, its population was 95, in 18 families.

References 

Populated places in Minab County